The Goegap Nature Reserve is a semi-desert nature reserve in Northern Cape, South Africa and lies around  east of Springbok. The area was once used to graze livestock and was proclaimed in 1966 as a reserve then fenced in 1969 and wildlife introduced shortly afterward. It was originally known as the Hester Malan Nature Reserve.

The name Goegap comes from the Khoekhoe word for "watering hole."

Geography 
There are roads for normal cars and tracks for 4x4 in the reserve. Looping trails ranging in length from 2 to 17 km start from the succulent garden.

Biodiversity 
The main attraction is the desert bloom that covers the sand with flowers in the spring provided enough winter rain. August and September are the most popular months to visit. Around 600 known plant species have been found here along with 45 mammal species and 94 types of bird.

Birds 
Bird species found in the reserve include Cape eagle-owl, Black eagle, Booted eagle, Ludwig’s bustard, White-backed mousebird, Karoo eremomela, Dusky sunbird, ostriches, spotted dikkops and Ground woodpecker.

Mammals 
Megafauna such as oryx, klipspringer, duiker, and the endangered Hartmann's mountain zebras call the park home. Other wildlife include smaller mammals, 26 reptile species, and 3 amphibian species.

Vegetation 
The Hester Malan Wild Flower Garden features a succulent garden and a rock garden. The information library has valuable resources on the succulent plants of Namaqualand to accompany the planted and labeled examples of the featured succulents.

Gallery

See also

 List of protected areas of South Africa

References

Nature reserves in South Africa
1966 establishments in South Africa